The 2003 Tour of the Basque Country was the 43rd edition of the Tour of the Basque Country cycle race and was held from 7 April to 11 April 2003. The race started in Legazpi and finished in Hondarribia. The race was won by Iban Mayo of the  team.

General classification

References

2003
Bas